The Ionian Sea (Iónio Pélagos ;) is an elongated bay of the Mediterranean Sea. It is connected to the Adriatic Sea to the north, and is bounded by Southern Italy, including Calabria, Sicily, and the Salento peninsula to the west, southern Albania (and western Apulia, Italy) to the north, and the west coast of Greece, including the Peloponnese.

All major islands in the sea, which are located in the east of the sea, belong to Greece. They are collectively named the Ionian Islands, the main ones being Corfu, Kefalonia, Zakynthos, Lefkada, and Ithaca.

There are ferry routes between Patras and Igoumenitsa, Greece, and Brindisi and Ancona, Italy, that cross the east and north of the Ionian Sea, and from Piraeus westward. The sea is one of the most seismically active areas in the world.

Etymology
The name Ionian comes from the Greek word . Its etymology is unknown. Ancient Greek writers, especially Aeschylus, linked it to the myth of Io. In ancient Greek the adjective Ionios was used as an epithet for the sea because Io swam across it. According to the Oxford Classical Dictionary, the name may derive from Ionians who sailed to the West. There were also narratives about other eponymic legendary figures; according to one version, Ionius was a son of Adrias (eponymic for the Adriatic Sea); according to another, Ionius was a son of Dyrrhachus. When Dyrrhachus was attacked by his own brothers, Heracles, who was passing through the area, came to his aid, but in the fight the hero killed his ally's son by mistake. The body was cast into the water, and thereafter was called the Ionian Sea.

In the Cham Albanian dialect, the sea is known as "Fusha e zonjës", translated as "the lady's domain.

Geography

Extent
The International Hydrographic Organization defines the limits of the Ionian Sea as follows:

On the North. A line running from the mouth of the Butrinto River (39°44'N) in Albania, to Cape Karagol in Corfu (39°45'N), along the North Coast of Corfu to Cape Kephali (39°45'N) and from thence to Cape Santa Maria di Leuca in Italy.

On the East. From the mouth of the Butrinto River in Albania down the coast of the mainland to Cape Matapan.

On the South. A line from Cape Matapan to Cape Passero, the Southern point of Sicily.

On the West. The East coast of Sicily and the Southeast coast of Italy to Cape Santa Maria di Leuca.

Places

From south to north in the west, then north to south in the east:
Syracuse, port, W
Catania, port, W
Messina, port, W
Taranto, port N
Himara, small port, NE
Saranda, port and a beach, NE
Kerkyra, port, E
Igoumenitsa, port, E
Parga, small port, E
Preveza, port, E
Astakos, port, E
Argostoli, port, E
Patra, port, E
Kyparissia, port, E
Pylos, port, E
Methoni, small port and a beach
Ionian Islands

Gulfs and straits
Strait of Messina, W
Gulf of Catania, W
Gulf of Augusta, W
Gulf of Taranto, NW
Gulf of Squillace, NW
Ambracian Gulf, E
Gulf of Patras, connecting the Gulf of Corinth, ESE
Gulf of Kyparissia, SE
Messenian Gulf, SE
Laconian Gulf, ESE

Islands 
 Corfu
 Kefalonia
 Ithaca
 Zakynthos
 Lefkada
 Paxi
 Kythira

Islets
 Antikythera
 Antipaxi
 Arkoudi
 Atokos
 Kalamos
 Kastos
 Ksamil Islands
 Kravia
 Kythros
 Lazareto (Ithaca)
 Lazaretto (Corfu)
 Meganisi
 Navtilos
 Pontikonisi
 Proti
 Sphacteria
 Skorpios
 Sparti (Lefkada)
 Stillo
 Strofades
 Tongo
 Vido

History

The Sea was the location of the famous naval battle between Octavian and Marc Antony known as The Battle of Actium, a war fought in 31 BC, and is also famous for the hero from Ancient Greek mythology named Odysseus, who was from the island of Ithaca.

See also

Calypso Deep

References

External links
 The Ionian-Puglia Network of Ground Meteorological Stations (real-time weather observations) 

 
Seas of Italy
Seas of Greece
Seas of Albania
Albania–Greece border
Marginal seas of the Mediterranean
European seas
Landforms of Corfu (regional unit)
Landforms of the Ionian Islands (region)
Landforms of Thesprotia
Landforms of Epirus (region)
Landforms of Preveza (regional unit)
Landforms of Aetolia-Acarnania
Landforms of Western Greece
Landforms of Cephalonia
Landforms of Achaea
Landforms of Messenia
Landforms of Peloponnese (region)
Geography of Southern Europe